The Chrissy B Show  is a British talk show that has been broadcast on MyTV since  September 2012 and is presented by Chrissy Boodram. The show features topical items such as News, style and beauty, food, health, real life and other similar features, all with a focus on mental health and well-being.

About The Show 

The Chrissy B Show airs on MyTV week nightly.

The Chrissy B Show airs on Sky 191 every Monday, Wednesday and Friday at 10pm. The show is repeated on Mondays, Tuesdays and Fridays at 11am.

Awards
Chrissy won a 'Global Women' Award early this year for best cover story.

References

External links

http://goodnewsshared.com/2016/04/19/chrissy-b-show-uks-tv-show-dedicated-mental-health-wellbeing-topics/

2012 British television series debuts
2010s British television talk shows
British television talk shows
English-language television shows